William "Billy" Mellor (date and place of birth unknown) was a footballer who played as a defender.

Having played as a young amateur for teams in Sheffield, Mellor was spotted by Sheffield United and offered a professional contract in the summer of 1892.  United had been accepted into Football League Division Two for the following season and Mellor struggled to meet the standard required, making only four league appearances for the club.

Mellow was transferred to local rivals The Wednesday in December 1893 where he spent a further eighteen months, but only managed one more league appearance.  From there he moved to Loughborough Town in May 1895, whom he also represented in The Football League.

Mellor then dropped out of league football and had spells with Oldham County, Swindon Town and Wigan County before finishing his career with Darwen.

Honours
Sheffield United
Football League Division Two
Runner-up: 1892–93

References

Year of birth missing
Date of death missing
Association football defenders
English Football League players
Sheffield United F.C. players
Sheffield Wednesday F.C. players
Loughborough F.C. players
Swindon Town F.C. players
Wigan County F.C. players
Darwen F.C. players
Northern Football League players
Place of birth unknown
English footballers